is a railway station in the city of Ichinomiya, Aichi Prefecture, Japan, operated by Meitetsu.

Lines

Station layout
The station has one side platform, serving a single bi-directional track.  The station has automated ticket machines, Manaca automated turnstiles and is unattended.

Adjacent stations

|-
!colspan=5|Nagoya Railroad

Station history
Tamanoi Station was opened on August 4, 1914. The station was closed in 1944 and reopened on December 28, 1951.

Passenger statistics
In fiscal 2013, the station was used by an average of 1544 passengers daily.

Surrounding area
Kamo Jinja

See also
 List of Railway Stations in Japan

External links

 Official web page 

Railway stations in Japan opened in 1914
Railway stations in Aichi Prefecture
Stations of Nagoya Railroad
Ichinomiya, Aichi